György Szuromi (born 14 June 1951) is a Hungarian former cyclist. He competed in the individual road race event at the 1980 Summer Olympics.

References

External links
 

1951 births
Living people
Hungarian male cyclists
Olympic cyclists of Hungary
Cyclists at the 1980 Summer Olympics
Cyclists from Budapest